Olgierd Ciepły (28 March 1936 – 5 January 2007) was a Polish athlete. He competed in the men's hammer throw at the 1960 Summer Olympics and the 1964 Summer Olympics.

References

External links
 

1936 births
2007 deaths
Athletes (track and field) at the 1960 Summer Olympics
Athletes (track and field) at the 1964 Summer Olympics
Polish male hammer throwers
Olympic athletes of Poland
People from Myadzyel District
Zawisza Bydgoszcz athletes
20th-century Polish people
21st-century Polish people